Navarretia is a genus of about 30 species of flowering plants related to the phloxes and the gilias. This is one genus of plants, among others, which are sometimes called pincushionplants. The inflorescence which bears the flowers is surrounded by frilly green bracts bearing soft spines, giving it the appearance of a pincushion. Several species are members of the vernal pool ecosystem.

Selected species:
Navarretia atractyloides - hollyleaf pincushionplant
Navarretia breweri - Brewer's pincushionplant
Navarretia capillaris - miniature gilia
Navarretia cotulifolia - cotulaleaf pincushionplant
Navarretia divaricata - divaricate navarretia
Navarretia eriocephala - hoary pincushionplant
Navarretia filicaulis - threadstem pincushionplant
Navarretia fossalis - vernal pool pincushionplant
Navarretia hamata - hooked pincushionplant
Navarretia heterandra - Tehama pincushionplant
Navarretia heterodoxa - Calistoga pincushionplant
Navarretia intertexta - needleleaf pincushionplant
Navarretia jaredii - mitrefruit pincushionplant
Navarretia jepsonii - Jepson's pincushionplant
Navarretia leptalea - Bridges' pincushionplant
Navarretia leucocephala - whitehead pincushionplant, many-flowered pincushionplant
Navarretia mellita - honey-scented pincushionplant
Navarretia nigelliformis - adobe pincushionplant
Navarretia ojaiensis - Ojai navarretia
Navarretia peninsularis - Baja pincushionplant
Navarretia prolifera - bur pincushionplant
Navarretia prostrata - prostrate pincushionplant
Navarretia pubescens - downy pincushionplant
Navarretia rosulata - San Anselmo pincushionplant
Navarretia setiloba - Piute Mountain pincushionplant
Navarretia sinistra - Alva Day's pincushionplant
Navarretia squarrosa - skunkbush
Navarretia subuligera - awl-leaf pincushionplant
Navarretia tagetina - marigold pincushionplant
Navarretia viscidula - sticky pincushionplant

External links
Jepson Manual Treatment

 
Polemoniaceae genera
Flora of North America